Doug Gibson may refer to:

 Doug Gibson (ice hockey) (born 1953), Canadian ice-hockey player
 Doug Gibson (swimmer) (born 1930), Canadian swimmer
 Doug Gibson (ornithologist) (1925/26–1984), Australian ornithologist